Lemon Andersen (born Andrew Andersen; April 21, 1975) is an American poet, spoken word artist and actor. He is sometimes credited as Lemon. Born and raised in Brooklyn, New York, he still resides there. He is the son of Milagros "Mili" Quiñones, from Puerto Rico, and Peter Andersen, a Norwegian-American from Bensonhurst, Brooklyn. Growing up in poverty, as a teenager Lemon experienced the successive deaths of his stepfather, father, and mother from complications of heroin abuse and AIDS, leaving him and his older brother orphaned and forced to fend for themselves. Lemon became involved in serious crime, but his growing passion first for hip hop and then acting, and a succession of gifted mentors who recognized and nurtured his theatrical talent, resulted in his development into the powerful artist portrayed in County of Kings and Lemon. Today a much-lauded "wordsmith who thinks deeply about the sounds of syllables", Lemon Andersen's writing and live performances have received widespread popular and critical acclaim. In his November 2011 TEDYouth talk Please don't take my Air Jordans, Lemon's performance of the title poem by Reg E. Gaines is followed by his own spoken-word riff on the influence of Gaines, Etheridge Knight, and other poets on his creative growth as a poet and spoken word artist.

Poetry 
As a poet Lemon Andersen has the most aired episodes on HBO's Def Poetry, eight times in six seasons, and was an original cast member of the Russell Simmons Def Poetry Jam on Broadway (2002-2003), for which he won the Tony Award for Best Special Theatrical Event in 2003 and the Drama Desk nomination for Unique Theatrical Experience that same year. His poetry collections include Ready Made Real: Poems (2004) and County of Kings (2009), both of which were published independently by County of Kings Publishing.

Spoken word 
Andersen has traveled the spoken-word and theater scene for the last decade performing and selling out venues such as the Nuyorican Poets Cafe, Apollo Theater, Chicago Theater, and Hollywood’s Kodak Theatre. On July 2, 2005 he performed in front of 500,000 people at Philadelphia’s Live 8 concert. Nike also chose him to write a piece to help them sign young basketball star LeBron James.

Movies 
In film, Lemon appeared in The Soloist (2009), directed by Joe Wright and starring Robert Downey Jr. and Jamie Foxx. He has shot four movies with Spike Lee, including Sucker Free City (2004), She Hate Me (2004), Inside Man (2006) (appearing opposite Denzel Washington and Clive Owen), and Miracle at St. Anna (2008). More recently, he is featured in the internationally acclaimed documentary film Lemon, screened in 2012-2013 at film festivals and performing arts centers across North America. It premiered on television as the fourth episode in America's PBS Voces series on October 19, 2012.

Theater 
Lemon Andersen's theater credits include Slanguage, directed by Jo Bonney, The Ride at PS 122, and U at the Mark Taper Forum, as well as teaching performance art workshops at different colleges, universities and institutions including Harvard University, Princeton University, the University of Massachusetts Amherst, and Sing Sing Prison. He has recently starred in a touring one person show titled County of Kings: The Beautiful Struggle, which was developed and produced through The American Place Theatre's Literature to Life program. Since its premier in 2009, performances have been staged to rave reviews at campuses and theaters across the U.S. and on three continents. This coming-of-age memoir, which mixes poetry and prose, was the grand prize winner in the 2010 New York Book Festival.

Playwriting 
As a Baryshnikov Arts Center Resident Artist from November 26-December 1, 2012, Andersen worked with director Elise Thoron and sound designer Robert Kaplowitz on the score for his new play ToasT, focusing on African-American poetic narratives in the setting of Attica Prison at the time of the 1971 riots. ToasT was commissioned by the Sundance Institute and recently showed, as ToasT (Work in Progress), in Off-Broadway's Under the Radar Festival at The Public Theater in Lower Manhattan, New York.

Video games
Lemon was the voice actor for Pharaoh, Boxcar and Axel in The Warriors and The Crowd of Liberty City in Grand Theft Auto IV.

References

External links
 
 
 Images of Lemon Andersen

1975 births
Living people
Poets from New York (state)
American male film actors
Male actors from New York City
Writers from Brooklyn
American people of Norwegian descent
American people of Puerto Rican descent
American spoken word artists
Musicians from Brooklyn
People from Bensonhurst, Brooklyn
21st-century American poets